James Robert B. Quincey (8 January 1965) is a British businessman based in the United States. After starting his career at Bain & Co, he joined The Coca-Cola Company in 1996 and was later named chief operating officer (COO). He is now the chairman and chief executive officer (CEO) at the company.

Early life
James Robert B. Quincey was born on 8 January 1965 in London, England, and lived in Hanover, New Hampshire, US for three years when his father was a lecturer in biochemistry at Dartmouth College. By age five, they had moved to Birmingham, England. He attended private King Edward's School, Birmingham and has a bachelor's degree in electronic engineering from the University of Liverpool. He is fluent in Spanish.

Career

Joining Coca-Cola
After working with Bain & Co and a smaller consultancy, he joined Coca-Cola in 1996. With Coke he has lived in Latin America and worked for Coke in Mexico, where he led the acquisition of Jugos del Valle. He was president of the Northwest Europe & Nordics Business Unit from 2008 until 2012. In 2013, he became president of Coca-Cola's Europe Group. In Europe, he oversaw Coca-Cola's acquisition of Innocent Drinks, and the sale and consolidation of Coca-Cola's bottling operations in Europe. When he was working with Coke early on, Bloomberg says he was instrumental in getting the company to sell smaller portions.

COO and President
In August 2015, Coke made him the chief operating officer (COO). He became president later that year. He outlined a plan to have five category clusters for brands in the company. He also changed management and the entire Coke hierarchy.

Chairman and CEO

He was named CEO in December 2016. He became CEO the following May when Muhtar Kent retired. Among his first acts as CEO, he announced reducing 1,200 corporate positions as part of a plan to invest in new products and marketing and restore the year's revenue and profit growth from four to six percent. Quincey also said in interviews that he wanted to rid the Coke company's culture of over-cautiousness concerning risk, and that he intended to further diversify Coke's portfolio by accelerating investments in startup businesses. He later launched a plan to recycle a bottle for every bottle sold by 2030. On 24 April 2019, Quincey was elected chairman of the board. In December 2021 Quincey announced the planned discontinuation of many of its slower selling products such as Tab and Zico coconut water.

Personal life
Quincey and his wife Jacqui have two children, and live in Atlanta, Georgia.

References

1965 births
Living people
American chief executives of food industry companies
Coca-Cola people
People educated at King Edward's School, Birmingham
Alumni of the University of Liverpool
Businesspeople from London